Maria Byrne  is professor of marine and developmental biology at the University of Sydney and a member of the Sydney Environment Institute. She spent 12 years as director of the university's research station on One Tree Island.

With Timothy O'Hara she is the co-editor of Australian Echinoderms. She and O'Hara were joint winners of the 2018 Whitley Medal for the book. She has been publishing her research on Echinodermata since the early 1980s. 

Her research interests include the impact of climate change on marine invertebrates,  evolutionary developmental biology,  the crown of thorns star-fish and other echinodermata. Her most cited article (October 2020) with 966  (or 1314) citations  is "Global warming and recurrent mass bleaching of corals".

Byrne was elected Fellow of the Australian Academy of Science in 2019.

Selected publications

References

External links 

 Profile of Professor Maria Byrne, University of Sydney
 Video of Maria Byrne by the Australian Academy of Science, 27 May 2019

Living people
Year of birth missing (living people)
Australian marine biologists
Australian women scientists
Australian zoologists
Academic staff of the University of Sydney